David Spofforth (born 21 March 1969) is an English former professional footballer who played as a defender in the Football League for York City, and in non-League football for Poppleton, York Railway Institute, Nestlé Rowntree and Selby Town.

References

External links
 David Spofforth at 11v11.com

1969 births
Living people
Footballers from York
English footballers
Association football defenders
York City F.C. players
York Railway Institute A.F.C. players
Nestlé Rowntree F.C. players
Selby Town F.C. players
English Football League players